The List of newspapers in Oklahoma lists every daily and non-daily news publication currently operating in the U.S. state of Oklahoma. The list includes information on where the publication is produced, whether it is distributed daily or non-daily, what its circulation is, and who publishes it. For those newspapers that are also published online, the website is given.  This is a list of daily newspapers currently published in Oklahoma. For weekly newspapers, see List of newspapers in Oklahoma.

List of active newspapers

List of defunct newspapers

See also
 Oklahoma media
 List of radio stations in Oklahoma
 List of television stations in Oklahoma
 Media of locales in Oklahoma: Broken Arrow, Lawton, Norman, Oklahoma City, Tulsa
 Journalism
 :Category:Journalists from Oklahoma
 University of Oklahoma Gaylord College of Journalism and Mass Communication

References
NOTE: Uncited circulation information comes from Finder Binder: Oklahoma's Updated Media Directory, 2010 Winter Issue
 

Bibliography
 
 
 
 Joseph B. Thoburn and John W. Sharp. History of the Oklahoma Press and the Oklahoma Press Association (Oklahoma City: Oklahoma Press Association, 1930).
 
  (Includes information about newspapers)
 
 L. Edward Carter. The Story of Oklahoma Newspapers, 1844 to 1984 (Oklahoma City: Oklahoma Heritage Association, 1984).

External links

 
 
 
  (Directory ceased in 2017)
 
  
  (Includes Oklahoma newspapers)
 
 
 
 
 

Oklahoma